Altomonte is a town and comune in the province of Cosenza, in the Calabria region of southern Italy.

People
 Vincenzo Di Benedetto, classical philologist

Twin towns
 Vigarano Mainarda, Italy

References

Cities and towns in Calabria